The doubles luge competition at the 1968 Winter Olympics in Grenoble was held on 18 February, at Villard-de-Lans. With his win, Thomas Köhler became the first person to win in both men's singles (1964) and doubles.

Results

References

Luge at the 1968 Winter Olympics
Men's events at the 1968 Winter Olympics